Abigail Breslin (born April 14, 1996) is an American actress. She rose to prominence with the comedy-drama film Little Miss Sunshine (2006), for which she received a nomination for the Academy Award for Best Supporting Actress at age 10. She went on to establish herself as a mainstream actress with roles in the films No Reservations (2007), Nim's Island (2008), Definitely, Maybe (2008), My Sister's Keeper (2009), Zombieland (2009), Rango (2011), The Call (2013), August: Osage County (2013), Maggie (2015), Freak Show (2017), Zombieland: Double Tap (2019), and Stillwater (2021). Between 2015 and 2016, she had a starring role in the horror-comedy series Scream Queens on Fox, her first regular role in a television series.

Early life
She was born in New York City, the daughter of Kim (née Walsh), a talent manager, and Michael Breslin, a telecommunications expert, computer programmer, and consultant. She has two older brothers, Ryan Breslin (b. 1985) and Spencer Breslin (b. 1992), who are also actors. The Breslin siblings were raised in New York in a "very close-knit" household. Her father was of Jewish heritage.

Breslin is named after Abigail Adams, the first Second Lady of the United States. As of 2013, she was still residing in the same Lower East Side apartment in which she was raised.

Career

Early roles 
Breslin's career began at the age of three when she appeared in a Toys "R" Us commercial. Her first acting role was in Signs (2002), directed by M. Night Shyamalan, where she played Bo Hess, the daughter of the main character, Graham Hess (Mel Gibson). Signs garnered mostly positive reviews and was a box office success, grossing $408 million worldwide. Breslin's performance in the film was praised by critics. David Ansen of Newsweek wrote that she and co-star Rory Culkin gave "terrifically natural, nuanced performances". In 2004, she appeared in Raising Helen, in which she and her brother Spencer played siblings, but the film fared poorly.

Breslin had a small role in The Princess Diaries 2: Royal Engagement. In the independent film Keane, she played Kira Bedik, a young girl who reminds the mentally disturbed protagonist William Keane (Damian Lewis) of his missing, abducted daughter. Keane had a limited theatrical release and grossed only $394,390 worldwide but it received positive reviews and Breslin's performance was praised by critics. Meghan Keane of The New York Sun wrote that "the scenes between Mr. Lewis and the charmingly fragile Kira, winningly played by Ms. Breslin, bring a captivating humanity to the film".

2000s 
Breslin's breakthrough role was in the 2006 comedy-drama Little Miss Sunshine, where she played Olive Hoover, a beauty pageant contestant, the youngest in a dysfunctional family on a road trip. She was cast at the age of six, years before filming was started. Her co-stars, Greg Kinnear and Alan Arkin, both stated that they were "astounded by her seriousness of purpose during shooting." Little Miss Sunshine was a critical and commercial success, grossing $100 million worldwide. Her performance was highly praised; Claudia Puig of USA Today wrote that, "If Olive had been played by any other little girl, she would not have affected us as mightily as [she] did." She received nominations for the Screen Actors Guild Award and Academy Award for Best Supporting Actress, becoming the fourth youngest actress to be nominated in that category. Although Jennifer Hudson won the Oscar, Breslin co-presented with actor Jaden Smith at the 79th Academy Awards on February 25, 2007. Breslin was part of the Disney Year of a Million Dreams celebration. Annie Leibovitz photographed her as Fira from Disney Fairies with Dame Julie Andrews as the Blue Fairy from Pinocchio.

On October 27, 2007, Breslin made her stage debut in the play Right You Are (If You Think You Are) in New York City at the Guggenheim Museum starring in an ensemble cast, including Cate Blanchett, Dianne Wiest, Natalie Portman and Peter Sarsgaard. In 2007, Breslin was ranked No. 8 in Forbes magazine's list of "Young Hollywood's Top-Earning Stars", having earned $1.5 million in 2006. Breslin next appeared in the 2007 romantic comedy No Reservations, playing the niece of master chef Kate Armstrong (Catherine Zeta-Jones). The film garnered mostly negative reviews but was successful at the box office, grossing $92 million worldwide. Roger Ebert wrote that Breslin "has the stuff to emerge as a three-dimensional kid, if she weren't employed so resolutely as a pawn." In 2007, she also starred in Definitely, Maybe, as the daughter of a recently divorced father (played by Ryan Reynolds); the film garnered generally favorable reviews, with Steven Rea of The Philadelphia Inquirer writing that Breslin is "alarmingly cute – but she backs the cuteness up with serious acting instinct."

In 2008, Breslin starred with Jodie Foster in the film Nim's Island as Nim Rusoe, a young girl who lives on a remote tropical island. Nim's Island received mixed reviews but was successful financially, grossing $100 million worldwide. In 2008, she appeared in Kit Kittredge: An American Girl as the title role. The film was based on the American Girl line of dolls, books, and accessories of which Breslin is a fan. Kit Kittredge: An American Girl garnered favorable reviews and grossed $17 million at the box office. Breslin's performance in the film was praised by critics; Joe Morgenstern of The Wall Street Journal wrote that she "carries the event-stuffed story with unflagging grace."

In 2009, Breslin appeared in My Sister's Keeper, where she played the role of Anna Fitzgerald, a young girl who was conceived to be a donor for her sister, Kate, who suffers from leukemia. Elle and Dakota Fanning were slated to play the roles of Anna and Kate respectively; however, Dakota refused to shave her head for the role, so she and Elle were replaced by Sofia Vassilieva and Breslin. My Sister's Keeper received mixed reviews but was a financial success, grossing $95 million worldwide. James Berardinelli wrote that Breslin and Vassilieva "display a natural bond one might expect from sisters, and there's no hint of artifice or overacting in either performance." Also in 2009, Breslin appeared in the horror comedy Zombieland as Little Rock. Director Ruben Fleischer said that "the dream was always to get Abigail Breslin" for the role. The film received positive reviews and was successful at the box office, grossing $102 million worldwide.

2010s 
With previews beginning in February 2010, she made her Broadway debut as Helen Keller in The Miracle Worker at the Circle in the Square Theatre. Breslin has said that she was honored to play Keller, who is one of her "biggest heroes". The Alliance for Inclusion in the Arts, an advocacy group for blind and deaf actors, criticized the play's producers for not casting a deaf or blind actor in the role. Lead producer David Richenthal defended the decision, saying that he needed a well-known actress: "It's simply naïve to think that in this day and age, you'll be able to sell tickets to a play revival solely on the potential of the production to be a great show or on the potential for an unknown actress to give a breakthrough performance." Vision-impaired actress Kyra Siegel was cast as Breslin's understudy. Breslin's performance was praised by critics; Frank Scheck of The Hollywood Reporter wrote that she "well portrays Helen's feral rebelliousness in the play's early sections and is deeply touching as her character's bond with her teacher grows." Ticket sales for the play, however, were considered disappointing, and the show closed in April 2010. In September 2009, Breslin filmed in Des Moines, Iowa, playing the title role in the film Janie Jones: a 13-year-old girl who is abandoned by her former-groupie mother (Elisabeth Shue), and informs Ethan Brand (Alessandro Nivola), a fading rock star, that she is his daughter. The film premiered at the 2010 Toronto International Film Festival. 

In 2011, Breslin voiced Priscilla, a cactus mouse in the Nickelodeon Movies' animated comedy Rango, and appeared in the romantic comedy New Year's Eve. In 2013, she appeared in the thriller The Call. The film received mixed reviews from critics. Andrew Barker of Variety wrote that Breslin "acquits herself well enough for a problematic role in which she's forced to cry and scream nearly continuously." The Call grossed $68 million worldwide. In 2013, Breslin also appeared in Haunter in the role of Lisa, a ghost who bonds with a future girl living in her house to stop an evil killing spirit with the help of his many victims.

Breslin also starred in the film adaptation of Orson Scott Card's novel, Ender's Game The film received mixed reviews from critics but it was a disappointment at the box office, grossing only $125 million worldwide from a $110 million budget. In July 2012, she was cast in August: Osage County, the film adaptation of the Pulitzer Prize-winning play of the same name, alongside Julia Roberts, Benedict Cumberbatch, and Meryl Streep. August: Osage County was released in December 2013, and received mostly positive reviews. In 2014, Breslin appeared in the crime drama Perfect Sisters. In January 2015, she was cast in Fox's horror-comedy series Scream Queens, which aired from September 2015 to December 2016.

In 2019, Breslin reprised her role as Little Rock in the horror comedy sequel film Zombieland: Double Tap.

2020s 
In 2021, Breslin starred opposite Matt Damon in the crime drama film Stillwater, directed by Tom McCarthy.

Personal life
In April 2017, Breslin disclosed that an ex-boyfriend had raped her, and she had since been diagnosed with PTSD. She explained that she did not report being raped at the time because she "was in complete shock and total denial", "feared not being believed" by the police, worried about revenge by the assailant if he found out and concerned about him hurting her family. She continues to advocate against sexual assault.

Her father, Michael, died at age 78 on February 26, 2021, of complications related to COVID-19.

In February 2022, Breslin revealed on Instagram that she was engaged to her longtime boyfriend Ira Kunyansky. They married on January 28, 2023.

Filmography

Film

Television

Video games

Discography

Soundtrack Album

Extended plays

Singles

As featuring artist

Other appearances

Accolades

References

External links

 
 
 
 

1996 births
Living people
Actresses from New York City
American child actresses
American film actresses
American people of Austrian-Jewish descent
American stage actresses
American television actresses
American voice actresses
Jewish American actresses
Outstanding Performance by a Cast in a Motion Picture Screen Actors Guild Award winners
People from the Lower East Side
21st-century American actresses
21st-century American Jews